Rumesh Silva (born 8 May 1987) is a Sri Lankan cricketer. He made his List A debut for Hambantota District in the 2016–17 Districts One Day Tournament on 24 March 2017.

References

External links
 

1987 births
Living people
Sri Lankan cricketers
Hambantota District cricketers